The Denver Champions of Golf was a golf tournament on the Champions Tour from 1982 to 1987.
It was played in Denver, Colorado, US, at the Pinehurst Country Club (1982), at the Green Gables Country Club (1983), and in Castle Rock at the TPC at Plum Creek (1984–1987).

The purse for the 1987 tournament was US$250,000, with $37,500 going to the winner. The tournament was founded in 1982 as the Denver Post Champions of Golf.

Winners
The Denver Champions of Golf
 1987 Bruce Crampton

Denver Post Champions of Golf
 1986 Gary Player
 1985 Lee Elder
 1984 Miller Barber
 1983 Don January
 1982 Arnold Palmer

Source:

References

Former PGA Tour Champions events
Golf in Colorado
Sports competitions in Denver
Recurring sporting events established in 1982
Recurring sporting events disestablished in 1987
1982 establishments in Colorado
1987 disestablishments in Colorado